I'm Poppy is a surreal comedy pilot starring American singer and YouTube personality Poppy. It premiered at the Sundance Film Festival on January 23, 2018, and is available exclusively on YouTube Premium. At the time, the producer expected further episodes.

Premise
The official Sundance Institute synopsis for the first episode states, "Join internet sensation Poppy as she enters the real world for the very first time and quickly realizes that fame and fortune come at a price, with secret societies, dangerous fanatics, and a very envious mannequin named Charlotte."

Cast and characters

Main
 Poppy as herself
 Samm Levine as Johnny
 Dan Hildebrand as Ivan Kross
 Brad Carter as Able Abraham
 Kofi Boakye as God and Satan
 Madison Lawlor as Pop Star

Guests
 Brian Dare as Benton
 Paige Annette as Crew Member #1
 Sierra Santana as Crew Member #2
 Dan Fleming as Crew Member #3
 Israel Wright as Cult Member
 Irena Murphy as Reporter

Production

Development
On December 4, 2017, director and writer of the series, Titanic Sinclair, officially announced the show on his Twitter account for the first time, describing it as "easily the most ambitious and exciting thing I’ve ever been a part of".  This was followed by an announcement of the dates it would be airing through during the festival: January 23, 24, and 26. On January 16, 2018, tickets to the show at the festival went on sale to the public. The series premiered on YouTube Red on January 25, 2018.

Poppy has described the series as being "based on real experiences" and that the producers are "just telling what it’s like to be in Hollywood."

The future of the series  is currently unknown, as Poppy and Sinclair parted ways creatively in late 2019.

Marketing
On January 22, 2018, a trailer for the series was uploaded to Poppy's YouTube account.

Episodes

Reception
The Hollywood Reporter critic Daniel Fienberg said he found the pilot episode "inspired and distinctive", but couldn't imagine the series "holding up for another episode". The Verges Adi Robertson said it didn't have the same hypnotic and ambiguous simplicity that many of the Poppy's videos do and that the episode was not "weird enough". Julia Alexander from Polygon said it was the proof that YouTube Red could be great, characterizing the series as "enjoyable" and "authentically YouTube".

References

External links
 Pilot episode preview
 

YouTube Premium original series
Poppy (entertainer)
Television pilots not picked up as a series